Upsala College (UC) was a private college affiliated with the Swedish-American Augustana Synod (later the Augustana Evangelical Lutheran Church) and located in East Orange in Essex County, New Jersey in the United States. Upsala was founded in 1893 in Brooklyn, in New York City, and moved to Kenilworth, and finally to East Orange in 1924. In the 1970s, Upsala considered moving to Wantage Township in rural Sussex County (where it opened a satellite campus) as East Orange's crime problem magnified and social conditions deteriorated. However, college administration and trustees chose to remain committed to East Orange. Declining enrollment and financial difficulties forced the school to close in 1995.

History

Early history (1893–1924)

Upsala College was founded at the 1893 annual meeting of the Swedish Evangelical Lutheran Augustana Synod in North America, known as the Augustana Synod—a Lutheran church body with roots in the Swedish immigrant community. The Augustana Synod placed an emphasis on mission, ecumenism, and social service. Meeting at Augustana College in Rock Island, Illinois, the polity decided to open the college in Brooklyn, New York, in October 1893. The Synod chose a young minister, the Rev. Lars Herman Beck (1859–1935), as the college's first president. Beck, a Swedish immigrant to the United States, had received his Ph.D. from Yale University in the previous year and turned down a teaching position at Yale to assume the post at Upsala.

The name Upsala was chosen to honor both the historic Uppsala University in Sweden and the Meeting of Uppsala.  That 1593 meeting—exactly 300 years before the founding of Upsala College—firmly established  Lutheran Orthodoxy in Sweden after the attempts by King John III to reintroduce Roman Catholic liturgy.

On October 3, 1893, Upsala College opened in the Swedish Evangelical Lutheran Bethlehem Church in Brooklyn. The first day, Beck began instruction with 16 students.  By the end of the year, Upsala had 75 students. Early instruction had been in Swedish as the student body largely consisted of Scandinavian immigrants. In 1897, the college moved to Kenilworth, New Jersey (formerly "New Orange, New Jersey") when the "New Orange Industrial Association" offered the young school fourteen acres of land. Upsala erected its first building on the Kenilworth campus in 1899.  The college granted its first Bachelor of Arts (B.A.) degrees in 1905 to four students.  By 1910, Upsala offered Bachelor of Arts in modern and classical languages, and Bachelor of Science (B.S.) degrees in Mathematics and Sciences, while offering a three-year college preparatory program, instruction in music for preparing "teachers of music, organist and choir leaders, and in general to afford its students a musical education", instruction in commerce and business to "train young men and women for a business career" and in stenography for students seeking "to fill positions as stenographers and private secretaries."  While the college was identified by its connection with the Swedish Lutheran community, Upsala was the first college in New Jersey to admit women, and its student body welcomed students from many other nationalities and religions. In 1908, the student body consisted of "79 Swedes, 2 Finns, 1 Jew, 1 'American', 1 Chinese, 1 Korean, and 1 Persian"

East Orange campus (1924–1995)
The college moved to East Orange in 1924 after purchasing a 45-acre site in the city in the previous year.

After the passage of Title IX, Audrey Donnelly became the school's Women's Tennis Coach.

In 1989, Upsala hosted the National Forensics Association national collegiate speech championship, which featured over 1,100 competitors over five days of competition.

However, the surrounding community's crime rate increased, and student enrollment declined throughout the late 1970s and 1980s.

Upsala's men basketball team made it to the 1980 NCAA Men's Division III Basketball Championship, losing to North Park University, 83 to 76.

Wirths Campus in Wantage (1978–1992)
During the tenure of Upsala's sixth president, Rodney O. Felder, Upsala sought to expand and acquired a  tract of land in rural Wantage Township in Sussex County in northwestern New Jersey for the construction of a second campus which was called the "Wirths Campus." In 1978, the land from a large family farm had been donated by Wallace "Wally" Wirths (1921–2002), a former Westinghouse Corporation executive, author, local newspaper columnist and radio commentator.

Upsala did not erect any academic buildings on the property, and in these formative years held classes in existing buildings. A few graduates studied at the campus until 1992 when classes ceased and the trustees chose to remain committed to East Orange. But when the school closed down in 1995 and the school's assets were dissolved, the Wirths family bought back their farm in Wantage from the college for $75,000.

Decline and closing
Throughout the 1970s and 1980s, Upsala suffered from severe financial problems and a declining enrollment.  The demographics of East Orange had changed in the aftermath of the Newark riots in the 1960s, and Upsala began to enroll larger numbers of minority students—a move thought to have upset the older Caucasian alumni and donors. East Orange's tax base and socio-economic conditions continued to deteriorate with an increase in crime statistics which made the college an unattractive setting for prospective students. By the early 1990s, the student body had decreased from approximately 1,500 to 435 when the school closed in 1995. The Middle States Association of Colleges and Schools announced that as a result of the decline in academic standards and the school's ongoing financial problems, it would not be renewing Upsala College's accreditation. On May 1, 1995, the college's board of trustees voted to close the school when its accreditation expired on May 31, 1995. The school closed with approximately US$12,500,000 in debt. The school's ninth and last president, Paul V. DeLomba, a partner and project manager with the financial services and accountancy firm Price Waterhouse, was hired by the board of trustees to close the college and dissolve its assets.

Legacy
After its closing in 1995, the college's East Orange campus was sold to the city for the use of the East Orange School District to build a new high school on half of the site constituting the college's East Campus. Several of the college buildings (including Beck Hall, Puder Hall, Viking Memorial Hall (gymnasium) and College Center) were incorporated into the new public secondary school, East Orange Campus High School. During this time, the west campus deteriorated and became blighted and its buildings were looted, vandalized and one building lost to arson. This section of campus was slated for residential redevelopment by the city government, and demolished in 2006. The demolition of the West Campus was featured in the "Coal Miner" episode in season 2 of the Discovery Channel television program Dirty Jobs that aired on August 8, 2006.

Upsala's campus radio station, WFMU, remains in operation; a nonprofit company known as Auricle Communications purchased WFMU's license shortly before Upsala was closed.

The majority, if not entirety, of the Upsala's library was sold to the newly established Florida Gulf Coast University in Fort Myers, FL. Its first classes were held in August 1997 with the books making up its original library.

Upsala transcripts can be obtained from Felician University. The college records were given to Augustana College.

There is an Upsala College Alumni group on Facebook.

Notable people

Upsala College in popular culture
 The characters Seymour "Swede" Levov and his wife Dawn Levov in Philip Roth's Pulitzer Prize-winning 1997 novel American Pastoral are graduates of Upsala. The character of Levov is based on Seymour "Swede" Masin (1920–2005), a popular Jewish athlete from Newark, New Jersey. However, Masin did not attend Upsala—he attended Panzer College, a teachers' college that later merged with Montclair State University.
 The 2001 film Riding in Cars with Boys directed by Penny Marshall and starring Drew Barrymore was filmed on the campus. It was based on an autobiography of the same name by Beverly Donofrio.

See also
 List of colleges and universities in New Jersey
 List of Lutheran colleges and universities in the United States

Notes and references

Notes

References

Other reading
Swedes And Deeds: The Ups And Downs Of Upsala College;  Schaad, Jacob,  Jr.; {Meadville, PA: Christian Faith Publishing,Inc., 2021

External links 
 Upsala College Alumni Page
 Jim Coleman's website on Upsala College
 Bill Taebel's website on Upsala College
 Upsala photographs on Flickr.com
 I nya Uppsala. Bref från Carl Sundbeck (Swedish, "In New Uppsala. Letter from Carl Sundbeck"), article in the Swedish periodical Hvar 8 Dag, 3:36 (1902).
 City of East Orange - Press Release: Groundbreaking Ceremonies for Woodlands at Upsala
 Website of former Upsala College radio station

 
1893 establishments in New Jersey
1995 disestablishments in New Jersey
Educational institutions established in 1893
Educational institutions disestablished in 1995
East Orange, New Jersey
Sussex County, New Jersey
Universities and colleges in Essex County, New Jersey
Defunct private universities and colleges in New Jersey